Rakht is a 2004 Indian supernatural horror film, written and directed by Mahesh V Manjrekar. The film stars Bipasha Basu, Sanjay Dutt, Suniel Shetty, Dino Morea, Amrita Arora and Neha Dhupia. A suspense thriller with supernatural tones, Rakht is paced around Drishti (Basu) who has an incredible ability to predict future with her cards and foresee certain incidents. Her client include an abused wife Riya (Dhupia) whose husband (Morea) threatens Drishiti with dire consequences if she did not stop counselling his wife. Mohit (Shetty) is a crazy mechanic who has a soft corner for Drishti. Natasha (Arora) a fast girl with a sensuous demeanour is engaged to Rahul (Dutt), a school Principal.

Natasha's sudden disappearance and murder brings together the characters. As more blood is spilled, the face of the killer begins to come together gradually before Drishti till the finale when killer stands exposed.The film released on 3 September 2004, and received mixed to negative reviews from critics, who praised the performances of Basu and Shetty, but criticized the story and screenplay.

Plot
The story is about a young widow named Drishti Nair. She is a psychic and has the gift of seeing into the future of anybody. After her break up with boyfriend Manav who truly loved her but had to move away to a different city, Drishti moves to a small remote village, where she meets Mohit, an eccentric car mechanic who needs psychiatric treatment due to years of abuse at the hands of his father. Mohit has a crush on Drishti, which Drishti is unaware of. She performs the job of Tarot card reading to locals, one of her customers being Rhea Trehan. Rhea is a young woman who is repeatedly beaten up by her husband Sunny. Rhea pleads for help to Drishti, when Drishti agrees to help her. Until, Drishti's son coming home from school one day and is harassed by Sunny, who calls Drishti a witch. Sunny tells her son to stay away from his mother.

Sunny also breaks into their house and threatens Drishti to stay out of Rhea's life. When Mohit investigates that Drishti is being troubled by Sunny, the two enter a violent confrontation. After the brawl, Sunny is seen nowhere near Drishti. Drishti is living happily, until one day, the daughter of Mayor Raja Bahadur Singh, Natasha, suddenly goes missing. Her fiancé Rahul  comes to Drishti and asks her for her help to find Natasha. Since Rahul is Drishti's son's school principal, she accepts. Soon enough, Drishti sees a vision of Natasha hung to her death opposite a river. Drishti informs Rahul, and the police finally find Natasha's dead body.

On top of this, it turns out that Sunny owns the river opposite to Natasha's death place. Sunny is then arrested, and the case of Natasha's murder is handed to ACP Ranbir Singh who does not believe in Drishti's gift, and also believes that Sunny is innocent, and the actual murderer is still free. And finally it is known that Rahul is the real murderer. He says he did it to avenge the loss of his dad in the mayoral election and is about to kill Drishti when Mohit knocks him out from behind. Mohit drives . Drishti to the police station where the inspector reveals Rahul accepted his crime but also says that Mohit committed suicide but according to Drishti he is waiting in the car. When she looks outside, Mohit is not there.

In the end, Drishti is finally reunited with Manav

Cast 
Sanjay Dutt as Principal Rahul Kumar
Suniel Shetty as Mohit Jaiswal
Dino Morea as Suniel Trehan / Sunny
Bipasha Basu as Drishti Nair
Amrita Arora as Natasha Badola
Neha Dhupia as Rhea Trehan
Himanshu Malik as Abhigyan Gupta
Rajat Bedi as ACP Ranbir Singh
Sharat Saxena as Mayor Raja Bahadur
Payal Rohatgi as Tanya Abrol
Shivaji Satam as Drishti's father
Shashikala as Drishti's grandmother 
Sachin Khedekar as Defending Lawyer for Sunny.
Abhishek Bachchan as Manav Rajput (guest appearance)
Yana Gupta as dancer in item song oh what a babe. (special appearance)

Soundtrack

Critical reception
Rediff.com stated that, "Suniel as Mohit has done a good job. Dino, as the abusive husband is very good especially when he threatens Bipasha at her home. Bipasha and Neha are competent. Sanjay is his usual deadpan till the climax. Amrita looks the hottest among the women. And though Abhishek Bachchan has only a tiny cameo in the film, he is charming." Planet Bollywood rated the film 5/10, stating, "Bipasha Basu impresses in a different look and role. She plays her role conservatively. Sanjay Dutt looked old, but was still okay. Sunil Shetty and Neha Dhupia are wasted. Amrita Arora as a hoochie is convincing. Dino Morea in a new avatar is a revelation." Taran Adarsh writing for Bollywood Hungama rated the film 2.5/5 and stated, "On the whole, RAKHT is appealing in parts and will therefore meet with mixed reactions from the paying public. At the box-office, the film should strike a chord with the multiplex-going viewers mainly [thanks to its classy look and city-centric treatment], but its prospects at mass-oriented cinema halls could prove to be a matter of concern.."

References

External links
 

2004 films
2000s Hindi-language films
2000s supernatural horror films
2000s ghost films
Indian supernatural horror films
Films directed by Mahesh Manjrekar
Indian horror film remakes
Films set in India
Indian ghost films
Indian mystery films
Films scored by Anand–Milind
Films scored by Anand Raj Anand
Films scored by Naresh Sharma
Films scored by Shamir Tandon
Indian remakes of American films